The 80th Pennsylvania House of Representatives District is located in central Pennsylvania and has been represented by James V. Gregory since 2019.

District profile
The 80th District is located in Blair County and Huntingdon County and includes the following areas: 

Blair County

Antis Township
Bellwood
Blair Township
Catharine Township
Duncansville
Frankstown Township
Freedom Township
Greenfield Township
Hollidaysburg
Huston Township
Juniata Township
Martinsburg
Newry
North Woodbury Township
Roaring Spring
Snyder Township 
Taylor Township
Tyrone 
Tyrone Township 
Williamsburg
Woodbury Township

Huntingdon County
Birmingham
Franklin Township
Warriors Mark Township

Representatives

References

Government of Blair County, Pennsylvania
80